Georges Bayle (25 February 1914 – 9 February 2000) was a French wrestler. He competed in the men's Greco-Roman bantamweight at the 1936 Summer Olympics.

References

External links
 

1914 births
2000 deaths
French male sport wrestlers
Olympic wrestlers of France
Wrestlers at the 1936 Summer Olympics
Place of birth missing